A wolf in sheep's clothing is an idiom of Biblical origin used to describe those playing a role contrary to their real character with whom contact is dangerous, particularly false teachers. Much later, the idiom has been applied by zoologists to varying kinds of predatory behaviour. The confusion has arisen from the similarity of the theme with fables of Aesop concerning wolves that are mistakenly trusted by shepherds; the moral drawn from these is that one's basic nature eventually shows through the disguise.

Origin and variants
The phrase originates in the Sermon on the Mount by Jesus recorded in the Christian New Testament: Beware of false prophets, which come to you in sheep's clothing, but inwardly they are ravening wolves (Gospel of Matthew 7:15, King James Version). The sermon then suggests that their true nature will be revealed by their actions (by their fruits shall ye know them, verse 16). In the centuries following, the phrase was used many times in the Latin writings of the Church Fathers and later on in European vernacular literature. A Latin proverb also emerged, Pelle sub agnina latitat mens saepe lupina (Under a sheep's skin often hides a wolfish mind). Although the story of a wolf disguised as a sheep has been counted as one of Aesop's Fables in modern times, there is no record of a fable with this precise theme before the Middle Ages, although there are earlier fables of Aesop in Greek sources to which the Gospel parable might allude.

The first fable concerning a wolf that disguises itself in a sheep's skin is told by the 12th-century Greek rhetorician Nikephoros Basilakis in a work called Progymnasmata (rhetorical exercises). It is prefaced with the comment that 'You can get into trouble by wearing a disguise' and is followed by the illustrative story. 'A wolf once decided to change his nature by changing his appearance, and thus get plenty to eat. He put on a sheepskin and accompanied the flock to the pasture. The shepherd was fooled by the disguise. When night fell, the shepherd shut up the wolf in the fold with the rest of the sheep and as the fence was placed across the entrance, the sheepfold was securely closed off. But when the shepherd wanted a sheep for his supper, he took his knife and killed the wolf.'  The conclusion drawn is different from the Gospel story. In the former one is warned to beware of hypocritical evil-doers; Nikephoros warns that evil-doing carries its own penalty.

The next version does not appear until three centuries later in the Hecatomythium of the 15th-century Italian professor Laurentius Abstemius. In his telling, 'A wolf, dressed in a sheep's skin, blended himself in with the flock of sheep and every day killed one of the sheep. When the shepherd noticed this was happening, he hanged the wolf on a very tall tree. On other shepherds asking him why he had hanged a sheep, the shepherd answered: The skin is that of a sheep, but the activities were those of a wolf.' Abstemius' comment on the story follows the Biblical interpretation: 'people should be judged not by their outward demeanor but by their works, for many in sheep's clothing do the work of wolves'.

Certain elements of this story are to be found in Aesop's fable of the shepherd who raised a wolf cub among his dogs. When it was grown, it secretly reverted to type. If a wolf stole a sheep and the dogs could not catch it, the guardian wolf continued the chase and shared the meal with the marauder. On other occasions it would kill a sheep and share the meat with the other dogs. Eventually the shepherd discovered what was happening and hanged the wolf. What may be a reference to this story occurs in an anonymous poem in the Greek Anthology in which a goat laments that it is made to suckle a wolf-cub,

The Greek fable is numbered 267 in the Perry Index. As in the case of The Walnut Tree, however, this would not have been the first time that Abstemius adapted one of Aesop's fables to fit a contemporary idiom, in this case that of the wolf in sheep's clothing. Though the commonest retelling of the story in English follows the version by Abstemius, it is often credited to Aesop.

Another variant fable by Aesop is number 234 in the Perry Index. This concerns a wolf that regularly comes to view the flock, but never attempts any harm. Eventually, the shepherd comes to trust it and on one occasion leaves the wolf on guard. He returns to find his flock decimated and blames himself for being taken in. In neither case is there the suggestion by Aesop that the wolf disguised itself as a sheep.

Yet another variation on the disguise theme was included in the Cento favole morali ("100 moral fables", 1570) of the Italian poet Giovanni Maria Verdizotti. In this the wolf dresses itself as a shepherd, but when it tries to imitate his call, it wakes the real shepherd and his dogs. Since the wolf is encumbered by its disguise, it cannot get away and is killed. This is the version followed in La Fontaine's Fables (III.3). The conclusion both poets draw is the same as that of Nikephoros. The story entered the English canon under the title "The wolf turned shepherd" in Roger L'Estrange's 1692 fable collection and in verse as "The Wolf in Disguise" in Robert Dodsley's Select fables of Esop and other fabulists (1765).

Artistic interpretations
Earlier illustrations of the fable concentrated on the hanging of the wolf. More recently, the emphasis has been on the disguise. In France, the theme of the wolf disguised in shepherd's clothing is more common and Gustave Doré's 1868 print of the subject was later reused in the 1977 set of postage stamps from Burundi featuring this and other fables.

A number of recent CDs are titled A Wolf in Sheep's Clothing, although most are references to the idiom and the fable is not mentioned in the words of any of the songs. The same is true of many songs that have the phrase as their title. One exception is the lyric by Tackhead on their 1991 CD Strange Things, which uses the fable for a satirical attack on Capitalist entrepreneurs.

In zoology

Zoologists have repeatedly compared predatory animals which make use of aggressive mimicry to a wolf in sheep's clothing, including jumping spiders, lacewings, ant-mimicking aphids, hemipteran bugs mimicking chrysomelid beetles, bird-dropping spiders, orchid mantises, cichlid fish, and the zone-tailed hawk which flies with vultures; these animals have evolved to deceive their prey by appearing as other prey, or like angler fish and snapping turtles lure the prey by appearing as the prey's prey.

References

External links

Book illustrations from the 15th - 20th centuries of "The wolf in sheep's clothing"
Book illustrations from the 17th - 19th centuries of "The wolf as shepherd"

Animal tales
Big Bad Wolf
Canines in religion
English-language idioms
Fables
Fables by Laurentius Abstemius
Wolf who played shepherd, The
Metaphors referring to sheep or goats
Metaphors referring to wolves
Sermon on the Mount
ATU 100-149